Quail is a collective name for several genera of mid-sized birds generally considered in the order Galliformes.

Quail may also refer to:

 Common quail, the bird Coturnix coturnix
 Buttonquail, a bird in the family Turnicidae

Places
 Quail, Texas, U.S., a census-designated place
 Quail Mountains, in Death Valley National Park in eastern California, USA
 Quail Valley, Missouri City, Texas
 Quail Run Elementary School, in Contra Costa County, California

Military
 ADM-20 Quail, an unmanned drone aircraft
 HMS Quail, several ships of the Royal Navy
 KDR Quail or TD4D Quail, an unmanned drone aircraft
 USS Quail (AM-15), a Lapwing-class minesweeper

People with the surname
 Charles E. Quail (1841—1910), American politician
 Paul Quail (1928—2010), British stained-glass artist
 Rebecca Quail (born 1988), Australian bowls player
 Douglas Quail and Kirsten Quail, fictional characters from We Can Remember It for You Wholesale by Philip K. Dick

People with the first name
 Quail Dobbs (1941—2014), American rodeo clown and performer
 Quail Hawkins (1905—2002), American author

Companies
 Dain, Kalman & Quail, American brokerage and investment banking firm, now part of RBC Wealth Management

See also
 Quail Creek (disambiguation)
 Quail Island (disambiguation)
 
 The Quails, a UK indie band
 The Quails (US band), a punk band
 Quayle, a surname
 Denis McQuail,  British communication theorist and professor
 Quail Motorcycle Gathering
 Quail Fire (2020)
 Madonna of the Quail

tl:Pugo (paglilinaw)